Zogaj may refer to the following settlements and location in Albania and Montenegro:

 Zogaj, Kukës, a village in Kukës County
 Zogaj, Shkodër, a village in Shkodër municipality
 Zogaj, a village in Ulcinj Municipality
 Zogaj mine, a chromium mine in Kukës County